Troy McKeown is an American politician and a Republican member of the Wyoming Senate, representing District 24 since January 4, 2021.

Career
Troy McKeown graduated from the University of Wyoming in 1987. Before entering politics, McKeown served 27 years in the United States Army as an artillery officer and retired as a lieutenant colonel. He was also a business owner. He is a member of both the Senate Labor, Health & Social Services Committee and the Senate Transportation, Highways & Military Affairs Committee.

Political viewpoints 
Troy McKeown advocates for equal access to education for all from kindergarten to 12th grade.

Elections

2020 
Troy McKeown won the Republican Primary against former incumbent Michael Von Flatern, winning 63.4% of the vote.

References

External links
Troy McKeown's campaign website

Living people
Republican Party Wyoming state senators
People from Cheyenne, Wyoming
University of Wyoming alumni
Webster University alumni
United States Army officers
Year of birth missing (living people)